Euryomma peregrinum is a small species of flies from the family Fanniidae. It is the type species of the genus Euryomma and was originally described by the German entomologist Johann Wilhelm Meigen, in 1826. Although, he placed it in another genus.

Biology
The larvae feed on decaying vegetable matter and carrion. Distribution is now most tropical and temperate regions worldwide, having been introduced. In Europe it is mainly Mediterranean.

Description
The adult is a small fly of about 3 – 4 mm. With bare arista (as in Fannia), with the first pre-sutural dorsocentral bristle less than half as long as the second. Males have a lower orbital bristle.

References 

Fanniidae
Insects described in 1826
Diptera of Europe
Taxa named by Johann Wilhelm Meigen